Erduran is a Turkish surname. Notable people with the surname include:

Ayla Erduran (born 1934), Turkish violinist 
Erol Erduran (born 1932), Turkish Cypriot educator and writer
Refik Erduran (1928–2017), Turkish playwright, columnist and writer

See also
 Erduran, Hınıs

Turkish-language surnames